Wokingham & Emmbrook F.C. are a football club based in Wokingham, Berkshire, England. The club was formed in 1875 as Wokingham Town and adopted their current name in 2004, following a merger with Emmbrook Sports. Their nickname is "The Satsumas", a reference to the team's colours.

History
Wokingham Town were founded in 1875 and moved to the Finchampstead Road ground in 1906. After success in local league football, they joined the Metropolitan League in 1954. Spells in the Delphian League, Corinthian League and Athenian League followed before they joined the Isthmian League in 1973. They were promoted to the Premier Division in 1982. They reached the first round of the FA Cup in 1982–83 taking Cardiff City to a replay and the semi-finals of the FA Trophy in 1987–88. Among their former players were Darren Barnard, Terry Brown, Paul Bence and Phil Alexander. However, they declined throughout the 1990s due to financial difficulties and were relegated from the Premier Division in 1995, and then from Division One in 1998. Finchampstead Road was sold to raise funds and the club left the ground in 1999 before it was demolished, moving on to a ground share with Windsor & Eton. They were relegated from Division Two in 2001 and following further ground shares with Flackwell Heath and Egham Town, the club decided to take demotion to the Hellenic League in order to return to Wokingham at Emmbrook Sports's Lowther Road ground, who, having been founded in 1989, had a much more modest history, being long-term members of the Reading League.

Wokingham & Emmbrook started in Division One East of the Hellenic Football League for the 2004–05 season. In November 2007, Wokingham Borough Council submitted a planning application to improve the facilities at Wokingham & Emmbrook's Cantley Park home. This would include a small stand accommodating 250 people and also flood lighting. At the end of the 2008–09 season the club won its first silverware by picking up the Reading Senior Cup with a 3–0 win over Woodley Town at the Madjeski stadium.

In December 2009, the club agreed a ground share with near neighbours Bracknell Town which ensured that after winning promotion in season 2009–10, they were able to compete in the Hellenic League Premier Division.

At the start of the 2011–12 season the club made its debut in the FA Cup reaching the first qualifying round. During October 2011 Woodley Town announced plans to join forces with Wokingham and Emmbrook to create a 'super-club' for the region. However, the plan was not fully confirmed. Wokingham believed this plan would allow them to upgrade their pitch at Cantley Park, after trying for several years, but the council have insisted that the park should remain in public use in its entirety and not sold off to private clubs.

On 22 May 2012 Wokingham and Emmbrook F.C. won the Reading Senior Cup 2012 defeating Highmoor Ibis 3–1 at the Madejski Stadium

On 21 May 2013 Wokingham and Emmbrook F.C. were able to retain their status as Reading Senior Cup winners, defeating Marlow United 2–1 at the Madejski Stadium

After a tough opening to the 2013/14 campaign for Wokingham & Emmbrook in August, the Sumas went unbeaten all season at home in the league at Lowther Road. As a result of this great form, in the end of the season Wokingham ended up 2nd place in the Hellenic Division One East.

On 15 May 2014 Wokingham were able to retain the Reading Senior Cup for the 3rd season running with an emphatic 5–0 win against local rivals Finchampstead at the Madejski Stadium.

In May 2015 the Sumas won the Reading Senior Cup for the 4th time on the bounce, beating local rivals Binfield 2-1 after extra time. The season was  a historic one for Wokingham & Emmbrook, winning the Hellenic Division One east securing their first ever league title.

In 2021 the club were promoted to the Premier Division South of the Combined Counties League based on their results in the abandoned 2019–20 and 2020–21 seasons.

Ground
Wokingham Town played at Finchampstead Road between 1906 and 1999, when it was demolished. The merged club started out at Lowther Road in Wokingham but as FA ground grading became more stringent for step 5 and 6 clubs they were forced to groundshare again at Bracknell Town and Henley Town. They also played at Cantley Park in Wokingham for which planning permission was granted for a 250-seat stand, but the plan fell through after the council refused to extend the club's lease on the ground. Planning permission was later granted for a 100-seater stand and floodlights at Lowther Road in 2016. Lowther Road has now been upgraded with floodlights and a stand which enables the club to continue in the Hellenic League.

Club honours
Isthmian League
 Premier Division runners-up 1989–90
 Division One winners 1981–82
Hellenic Football League Division One East:
 Runners-up: 2009–10, 2013–14 
Reading Senior Cup:
 Winners (5): 2008–09, 2011–12, 2012–13, 2013–14, 2014–15

Club records

Highest League Position: 2nd in Isthmian League Premier Division 1989–90
FA Cup best performance: First round 1982–83
FA Trophy best performance: Semi-final 1987–88
FA Vase best performance: Second round 1998–99, 2000–01, 2003–04
Highest Attendance (as Wokingham & Emmbrook): 305 v Binfield 28 March 2005

Staff
President: Mark Ashwell
Chairman: Steve Williams 
Secretary: Bob Good
1st Team Manager: Matt Cronan
Assistant Manager: Jamie Shepherd
Reserve Team Manager: Ian Narraway and Mark Best

References

External links
Official website

Hellenic Football League
Association football clubs established in 1875
Association football clubs established in 2004
1875 establishments in England
2004 establishments in England
Great Western Combination
Metropolitan League
Delphian League
Corinthian League (football)
Athenian League
Isthmian League
Football clubs in England
Wokingham
Football clubs in Berkshire
Combined Counties Football League